The 2011 Mobil 1 presents the Grand Prix of Mosport was held at Mosport International Raceway on July 24, 2011.  It was the fourth round of the 2011 American Le Mans Series.

Qualifying

Qualifying Result
Pole position winners in each class are marked in bold.

Race

Race result
Class winners in bold.  Cars failing to complete 70% of their class winner's distance are marked as Not Classified (NC).

References

External links
 2011 Grand Prix of Mosport Race Broadcast (American Le Mans Series YouTube Channel)

Mosport
Grand Prix of Mosport
Grand Prix of Mosport
Grand Prix of Mosport
Grand Prix of Mosport